Yodlee is an American software company that develops an account aggregation service that allows users to see their credit card, bank, investment, email, travel reward accounts, etc. on one screen. Money by Envestnet Yodlee (formerly Yodlee Labs and Yodlee MoneyCenter), a web application that helps consumers with their finances online, provides services such as bill payment, expense tracking, and investment management (similar to personal finance services provided by Intuit's Quicken). Yodlee's Privacy Policy FAQ references Yodlee as a licensee of the TRUSTe Privacy Program. Part of Yodlee's business model consists of selling its customers' financial transaction data to investors.

Yodlee's aggregation engine powers several applications for partners, including websites like Money Dashboard, MoneyStrand, Thrive, and several large banks and financial institutions.

Origins and history
Yodlee was started in 1999 by Venkat Rangan (vice chancellor of Amrita University), Sam Inala, Ramakrishna "Schwark" Satyavolu, Srihari Sampath Kumar (all formerly at Microsoft), and Sukhinder Singh (earlier at Amazon.com and Junglee).

Anand Rangarajan, Anand Pillai, Anand Madhavan, Balakrishna Nakshatrala, Bruce Lo, Ganesh Narasimhan,  Ji Li, Narayanan Seshadri, Nishant Murarka, Rajamohan Gandhasri, Senthil Pandurangan, Sandhya Pentareddy, Subhash Sankuratripati, Tim Armandpour, Vamsi Juvvigunta were the original Engineers who developed the product along with CTOs, Ramakrishna "Schwark" Satyavolu and Sam Inala.

Yodlee started operations in Sunnyvale, California initially and then moved its headquarters to Redwood Shores, California. It also has offices in London, UK, and Bangalore, India. In 2000, Yodlee merged with its main competitor in the data aggregation space, an Atlanta-based company called VerticalOne, which was owned at the time by SecurityFirst, an internet banking firm.

In 2010, Yodlee partnered with Y Combinator, providing its financial services platforms to all Y Combinatorfunded companies.

By 2010, Yodlee was said to have raised at least $116 million over its 10-year lifespan. In a press release in June 2008, it was announced that Bank of America led a $35 million financing round. Existing Yodlee investors, including its largest shareholder Warburg Pincus along with Accel Partners and Institutional Venture Partners, participated in the financing round.

As of 2013, Yodlee had over 45 million users, and over 150 financial institutions and portals (including 5 of the top 10 U.S. banks) offer services powered by Yodlee. 

On October 3, 2014, Yodlee went public on NASDAQ, trading under the symbol YDLE. It raised $75 million at $12 per share. On August 10, 2015 Yodlee sold itself to Envestnet for a reported $660 Million. As a result, it is no longer listed on the NASDAQ. In November 2017, Token partnered with Yodlee for payments and financial data aggregation.

Lawsuit 
Yodlee encountered a controversy in which lawmakers claim that they are selling consumers’ personal financial data without proper consent, calling on the Federal Trade Commission to investigate the matter. In August of 2020, a class-action lawsuit was filed against Envestnet and Yodlee. The plaintiff, Deborah Wesch, claimed that she and other consumers were put at risk because the companies failed to adequately protect their consumer data and put in place sufficient security protocols. Yodlee and Envestnet claimed that the consumers consented to have their data accessed, and that the consumers didn't experience any tangible injuries from the sale of their anonymized data.

See also 

 Plaid (company)

References

External links 
 https://www.yodlee.com/

Online financial services companies of the United States
Financial technology companies
Account aggregation providers
Companies based in Redwood Shores, California
Private equity portfolio companies
Warburg Pincus companies
Software companies based in the San Francisco Bay Area
Companies formerly listed on the Nasdaq
Software companies of the United States
Financial services companies established in 1999
Software companies established in 1999
2014 initial public offerings
2015 mergers and acquisitions
1999 establishments in California